Glebe Collegiate Institute (GCI) is a high school in the Glebe neighbourhood of Ottawa, Ontario, Canada. Administered by the Ottawa-Carleton District School Board (OCDSB), Glebe Collegiate Institute has approximately 1,700 students and is the district's largest school.

Students and sports teams are referred to as "Gryphons."

Glebe was selected as one of Canada's best schools in the August 23, 2004, edition of Maclean's news magazine.

The school offers specialized programs, such as French immersion, English as a second language, bilingual, gifted, and a learning disability and special education learning centre.

It has a percussion group called Offbeat, which uses things like trash cans, brooms, chalk dusters, and water barrels as instruments. The Improv Teams, have twice placed within the Canadian Improv Games national finals. Glebe's robotics program participates in US FIRST international robotics competition, and won the SKILLS Canada STEM and Controls competition in 2015.

Glebe's Reach for the Top trivia team has won the national championships twice, during the 2020-2021 and 2021-2022 school years.

In 2008 and 2010, a group of four science teachers (Andrew Cumberland, Dan Lajoie, Colin Harris, and Masato Kachi) from Glebe placed second in Canada in the Discovery Channel's Iron Science Competition.

Notable former students include NHL hockey players, including Hall of Famer Syd Howe, singer Alanis Morissette, Royal Canadian Air Farce member Luba Goy, and CBC news icon Peter Mansbridge.

History 

The school was founded not as an independent entity but as an expansion of the Ottawa Collegiate Institute.  In 1919 the Adolescent School Attendance Act had made attending school compulsory until age 16, leading to a dramatic rise in secondary school enrollment. The OCI had outgrown its existing facility (now Lisgar Collegiate Institute) and constructed a new facility on what was then the outskirts of the city.  The construction of "Ottawa Collegiate Institute, Glebe Building" was a slow process, and classes began in 1922 before it was complete, causing some inconveniences for students.  Symbols of the OCI continue to adorn the entrance to the school.  The building was officially opened in 1923.

The rivalry between Glebe and Lisgar Collegiate Institute commenced soon after the division of the OCI.  In one incident, a banquet was held at the Glebe building that included student clubs from both schools.  In the middle of the meal, a food fight erupted between the two groups and only an enraged principal could persuade students to stop.

In 1974, Glebe Collegiate Institute concert and stage bands produced an album, Something gold... Something blue, and in 1978 (January 30) produced a second album, Glebe Stage Band, on which a third album is suggested, all under the direction of music teachers Stan Clark Sr. and John Nichols.

As of 2012, Glebe's population was 1,700 students and 150 teachers.

Glebe Collegiate Institute was used in the filming of the 2008 Canadian-American drama film The Perfect Assistant. 

In the 2012–2013 school year, $9,000 was raised for cancer research, more than $17,000 for the Children's Hospital of Eastern Ontario (CHEO) as well as the largest food donation ever to the Centre Town Emergency Food bank. 

Students at Glebe Collegiate Institute during the 2010-2020 decade would sometimes help set up and take down a temporary dome at a nearby exhibition centre during the winter. In exchange, the company that owned the dome would let school sports teams at Glebe use the dome for practices. In later years, the aforementioned company would offer to build a turf field and another temporary dome on Glebe property for free, but the school board refused to give approval and construction was never started.

On October 19, 2017, Glebe Collegiate Institute went into lockdown after a gun and a bullet were found on school grounds. A young man was arrested, but there were no injuries.

On April 20, 2018, Glebe Collegiate Institute's Reach for the Top trivia team won the Ottawa Regional Championships for the first time in the school's history. This qualified Glebe Collegiate Institute's Reach for the Top team for the 2018 Provincials, where they placed 11th out of 38.

Glebe Collegiate Institute's Reach for the Top trivia team won the 2020-2021 and 2021-2022 national championships. The competitions were held online due to COVID-19.

Facility 
Constructed in the early 20th century, the school has an old-fashioned architectural style that has been kept consistent despite additions to the building. The school has recently gone through extensive renovations in its science department to make the labs the most modern in the school district.  Notable features of the building include ,

Constructed in the early 20th century, the school has an old-fashioned architectural style that has been kept consistent despite additions to the building. The school has recently gone through extensive renovations in its science department to make the labs the most modern in the school district.  Notable features of the building include an auditorium with balcony seating, a subbasement dedicated wholly to an orchestral music room, instrument storage, and the music teachers' office, and a small greenhouse on the roof, which few students have been to. The school once included an underground swimming pool, but it has been closed. The school is a Wi-Fi hotspot, and all students and teachers have access to the internet via wireless devices and computers. However, apart from the computer labs, Glebe still lacks air conditioning. Glebe has a full-size playing field that is used for a variety of high school sports like soccer, football, and baseball. Around the field, there are track and field running facilities with two full supporter stands.

Notable alumni and students  

 Donald Brittain, filmmaker with the National Film Board of Canada
 Edwin Orion Brownell, composer, entertainer
 Jock Climie, EX-CFL player and TSN analyst
 Bill Cowley,  Hall of Fame professional ice hockey player
 Brian Doyle, author
 Harvey Glatt, founder of CHEZ-FM; music impresario
 Luba Goy, later National Theatre School of Canada graduate; comedian most notable as a member of the Royal Canadian Air Farce 
 Elizabeth Hanna, later National Theatre School of Canada graduate; noted voice actor and speech-language pathologist
 Angela Hewitt, concert pianist
 Syd Howe, Hall of Fame professional ice hockey player
 Clark Johnson, actor, director, producer; played Canadian college football while attending Concordia University in Montreal, Quebec 
 John Manley, former cabinet minister; graduated from Bell High School
 Peter Mansbridge, news anchor for The National (CBC)
 Steve Marriner, Juno award-winning musician
 Dewey Martin (born Walter Midkiff), drummer for Buffalo Springfield
 David McGuinty, politician, MP
 Sean Michaels, Scotiabank Giller Prize winning author and music critic
 Hannah Moscovitch, celebrated national playwright, best known for her epic plays produced by Tarragon Theatre Toronto as playwright in residence.
 Alanis Morissette, seven-time Grammy award-winning singer
 Quddus, video jockey, MTV
 Michael J. Reynolds, actor, writer
 Rick Sowieta, linebacker for the Toronto Argonauts and the Ottawa Rough Riders
 Patrick Watson, author, television producer, director, interviewer and host

See also
List of high schools in Ontario

References

Bibliography

External links

Glebe Collegiate School
OCDSB Website
2006-2007 OCDSB school profile
2005-2006 OCDSB school profile
2004-2005 OCDSB school profile
2003-2004 Glebe school profile (PDF format)
Glebe Robotics
Glebe Music Program

High schools in Ottawa
Educational institutions established in 1929
1929 establishments in Ontario